Osteochilus repang is a species of cyprinid fish endemic to eastern Borneo, Southeast Asia.

References

Taxa named by Canna Maria Louise Popta
Fish described in 1904
Osteochilus